From Out of the Skies is the ninth studio album by the American hard rock band BulletBoys. The album was released March 23, 2018 on Frontiers Records. The track "D-Evil" features a guest appearance by Jesse Hughes from Eagles of Death Metal. The album was recorded at Dave Grohl's Studio 606 in Northridge, California.

Reception 
Vito Tanzi of Cryptic Rock rated the album 3 out of 5 stars. Marcos "Big Daddy" Garcia of Metal-Temple.com called the album "excellent", rating it an 8/10.

Track listing 
The track listing was adopted from iTunes. All songs written and composed by Marq Torien unless noted.

References 

2018 albums
BulletBoys albums
Frontiers Records albums